Yu Yuzhen (born 5 March 1998) is a Chinese track and field athlete competing in javelin throw. She competed in the women's javelin throw event at the 2019 World Athletics Championships held in Doha, Qatar. She did not qualify to compete in the final.

In 2015, she won the gold medal in the women's javelin throw at the Asian Youth Athletics Championships held in Doha, Qatar.

References

External links 
 

Living people
1998 births
Chinese female javelin throwers
World Athletics Championships athletes for China
21st-century Chinese women